Aspilapteryx filifera is a moth of the family Gracillariidae. It is known from Namibia and South Africa.

References

Aspilapteryx
Moths of Africa
Insects of Namibia
Moths described in 1912